is a planned short motorway in Hamburg in northern Germany.

The A 252 is called Hafenquerspange (port link road) and planned to connect the A 1 and A 7. It is planned to be finished in 2013. Following the rerouting of Wilhelm Reichsstraße, the A252 was downgraded to B 75 on 6 October 2019.

Exit list

 with  

 
|}

References

External links

 

252
A252
Proposed roads in Germany